This is a list of members of the Legislative Assembly of Queensland, the state parliament of Queensland, sorted by parliament.

See also
 Queensland Legislative Assembly electoral districts